The Salmon Mountains are a subrange of the Klamath Mountains in Siskiyou County, northwestern California.

Geography

The Salmon Mountains are a sub-mountain range within the Klamath Mountains System. The Klamath system are of the Pacific Coast Ranges series of mountain range systems that stretch along the West Coast of North America.

The Salmon range is within sections of the Klamath National Forest, Shasta-Trinity National Forest, and Six Rivers National Forest and includes portions of the Trinity Alps Wilderness Area, Russian Wilderness Area, and Marble Mountain Wilderness Area.

The Yurok and Hoopa Valley Indian Reservations are to the west. California State Route 299 runs along the south of the range.

Ecology
Ecoregion
The Salmon Mountains are within the Klamath-Siskiyou forests — Klamath Mountains ecoregion, which is part of the Temperate coniferous forests Biome.

Flora
Plant communities in the range include:
California mixed evergreen forest
Cedar hemlock douglas-fir forest

References

See also
List of mountain ranges of California
Index: Klamath Mountains System

Klamath Mountains
Mountain ranges of Siskiyou County, California
Klamath National Forest
Shasta-Trinity National Forest
Six Rivers National Forest
Mountain ranges of Northern California